Chimanbhai Saparia is an Indian politician from the Bharatiya Janata Party. He is a cabinet Minister of Gujarat State.

References

State cabinet ministers of Gujarat
Living people
Bharatiya Janata Party politicians from Gujarat
Year of birth missing (living people)
Place of birth missing (living people)